Events in the year 1133 in Norway.

Incumbents
Monarch - Magnus IV Sigurdsson along with Harald Gille

Events

Arts and literature

Births
Sigurd II of Norway, king (died 1155).

Deaths

References

Norway